The Champion City Kings are a college summer baseball team located in Springfield, Ohio.  The Kings are a member of the East Division of the wood bat Prospect League and have been a member since 2013.  The Kings play at Carleton Davidson Stadium, which is also the home of the NCAA DIII Wittenberg University Tigers.

The Kings are led by General Manager Ginger Fulton and Field Manager Gavin Murphy.

The franchise was previously located in Slippery Rock, PA and was known as the Sliders prior to relocating to Ohio in time for the 2014 season. The Sliders were originally a member of the Frontier League, but left the league after the 2007 season, its only year as a member.

Seasons

Roster

References

Prospect League teams
Springfield, Ohio
2013 establishments in Ohio
Amateur baseball teams in Ohio